Shirleen is a female given name. It may refer to:

 Shirleen Campbell (born 1981), Indigenous Australian activist against family and domestic violence
 Shirleen Roeder, American geneticist